The 2021 Super Formula Lights Championship was the second Super Formula Lights Championship season, after the Japanese Formula 3 Championship was rebranded following the end of the 2019 season. It featured drivers competing in Formula 3 cars with Dallara 320 chassis and with engines made by three different manufacturers, a similar regulation format to the Euroformula Open Championship.

Teams and drivers

Race Calendar 
The calendar for the 2021 season was announced on 30 October 2020. The championship supported Super Formula at all of its races. Because of this, the calendar change announced by Super Formula on 12 April 2021 was also adopted by Super Formula Lights.

Championship standings 
The points were awarded as follows:

Drivers' Championships

Overall

Masters Class

Teams' standings

Engine manufacturer standings

Footnotes

References

External links 

 Super Formula Lights official website – Japanese / English

Japanese Formula 3 Championship
Super Formula Lights
Super Formula Lights